Lynn Bradford is a former American football player who played four seasons in the Arena Football League with the Detroit Drive and Tampa Bay Storm. Before his professional career, he played college football at Prairie View A&M University.

References

External links
Just Sports Stats

Living people
Year of birth missing (living people)
American football fullbacks
American football linebackers
African-American players of American football
Prairie View A&M Panthers football players
Detroit Drive players
Tampa Bay Storm players
21st-century African-American people